The 2005 FIFA World Youth Championship was the 15th edition of the FIFA World Youth Championship. It took place in the Netherlands between 10 June and 2 July 2005.

Venues

Qualification 
The following 24 teams qualified for the 2005 FIFA World Youth Championship. Host country the Netherlands did not have to qualify for the tournament.

1.Teams that made their debut.

Sponsorship 
FIFA partners

 Adidas
 Coca-Cola
 Toshiba
 Fujifilm
 MasterCard
 McDonald's
 T-Mobile
 Yahoo
 Hyundai
 Philips
 Avaya

National supporters

 Hubo
 Unive
 FIFA.com
 FIFA Fair Play

Match officials

Squads 
For a list of all squads that played in the final tournament, see 2005 FIFA World Youth Championship squads.

Group stages 
The 24 teams were split into six groups of four teams. Six group winners, six second-place finishers and the four best third-place finishers qualify for the knockout round.

Group A

Group B

Group C

Group D

Group E

Group F

Ranking of third-placed teams

Knockout stages

Bracket

Round of 16

Quarter-finals

Semi-finals

Third place play-off

Final

Winners

Goalscorers 

6 goals
  Lionel Messi

5 goals

  Fernando Llorente
  Oleksandr Aliev

4 goals

  Graziano Pellè
  David Silva

3 goals

  Pablo Zabaleta
  Chen Tao
  Mouhcine Iajour
  Chinedu Ogbuke

2 goals

  Rafinha
  Renato
  José Pedro Fuenzalida
  Ricardo Parada
  Radamel Falcao
  Fredy Guarín
  Nicky Adler
  Marvin Matip
  Daniele Galloppa
  Tarik Bendamou
  Ryan Babel
  Hedwiges Maduro
  Taye Taiwo
  Juanfran
  Miquel Robusté
  Gokhan Gulec
  Sezer Öztürk

1 goal

  Julio Barroso
  Neri Cardozo
  Gustavo Oberman
  Ryan Townsend
  Nick Ward
  Abou Maiga
  Razak Omotoyossi
  Diego Tardelli
  Edcarlos
  Gladstone
  Fábio Santos
  Rafael Sobis
  Marcel de Jong
  Jaime Peters
  Matías Fernández
  Gonzalo Jara
  Pedro Morales
  Cui Peng
  Hao Junmin
  Gao Lin
  Lu Lin
  Tan Wangsong
  Zhao Xuri
  Zhou Haibin
  Zhu Ting
  Harrison Otálvaro
  Wason Rentería
  Hugo Rodallega
  Christian Gentner
  Alexander Huber
  Michele Canini
  Andrea Coda
  Raffaele De Martino
  Sota Hirayama
  Shunsuke Maeda
  Koki Mizuno
  Abdessalam Benjelloun
  Adil Chihi
  Reda Doulyazal
  Nabil El Zhar
  Quincy Owusu-Abeyie
  Ibrahim Afellay
  Urby Emanuelson
  Collins John
  Rick Kruys
  Ron Vlaar
  David Abwo
  Olubayo Adefemi
  Isaac Promise
  Mikel John Obi
  John Owoeri
  Jose Venegas
  Baek Ji-hoon
  Park Chu-young
  Shin Young-rok
  Jonathan Soriano
  Francisco Molinero
  Víctor
  Alberto Zapater
  Goran Antić
  Johan Vonlanthen
  Majed Al Haj
  Mohamad Al Hamawi
  Abdelrazaq Al Hussain
  Maxym Feschuk
  Dmytro Vorobei
  Chad Barrett
  Hunter Freeman
  Jacob Peterson

Awards

Final ranking

External links 
 FIFA World Youth Championship Netherlands 2005 , FIFA.com
 RSSSF > FIFA World Youth Championship > 2005
 FIFA Technical Report

Fifa World Youth Championship, 2005
FIFA
FIFA World Youth Championship
International association football competitions hosted by the Netherlands
2004–05 in Dutch football
FIFA World Youth Championship
FIFA World Youth Championship
Lionel Messi